John Lang Nichol,  (January 7, 1924 – February 24, 2020) was a Canadian politician who served as a senator from 1966 to 1973.

Born in Vancouver, British Columbia, he was president of the Liberal Federation of Canada for two terms from 1964 until 1968 and served as co-chairman of the Liberal Campaign Committee for the 1968 federal election. He was appointed to the Senate in 1966 by Lester Pearson and resigned in 1973.

He was chairman of the board of trustees of Lester B. Pearson College. He is the founding chairman of the Pacific Parkinson's Research Institute.

In 1980, he was made an Officer of the Order of Canada and was promoted to Companion in 1996.

In 1941, he married Marjorie Elizabeth Kenyon "Liz" Fellowes; she died of Parkinson's disease in December 2000. His daughter Barbara is a writer.

Nichol died in February 2020 at the age of 96.

References 
 

1924 births
2020 deaths
Canadian senators from British Columbia
Companions of the Order of Canada
Liberal Party of Canada senators
Politicians from Vancouver